Knight Rider, an American television series, originally aired from 1982 to 1986, spanning four seasons and 90 episodes. The series was broadcast on NBC and starred David Hasselhoff as Michael Knight, a high-tech modern-day knight fighting crime with the help of KITT, an advanced, artificially intelligent and nearly-indestructible car.

The plot follows Michael Knight and KITT as they are sent on missions by the privately held "Foundation for Law and Government" (FLAG) in situations where "direct action might provide the only feasible solution".

Series overview

Episodes

Season 1 (1982–83)

Season 2 (1983–84)

Season 3 (1984–85)

Season 4 (1985–86)

References

External links 
 
 

 
Lists of American action television series episodes